Babysitting is temporarily caring for a child. Babysitting can be a paid job for all ages; however, it is best known as a temporary activity for early teenagers who are not yet eligible for employment in the general economy. It provides autonomy from parental control and dispensable income, as well as an introduction to the techniques of childcare. It emerged as a social role for teenagers in the 1920s, and became especially important in suburban America in the 1950s and 1960s, when small children were abundant. It stimulated an outpouring of folk culture in the form of urban legends, pulp novels, and horror films.

Overall
In developed countries, most babysitters are high school or college students (age 16+). Some adults have in-home childcare as well. They are not babysitters but professional childcare providers and early childhood educators. The work for babysitters also varies from watching a sleeping child, changing diapers, playing games, and preparing meals, to teaching the child to read or even drive, depending on the agreement between parents and babysitter.

In some countries, various organizations produce courses for babysitters, many focusing on child safety and first-aid appropriate for infants and children; these educational programs can be provided at local hospitals and schools. Different activities will be needed for babies and toddlers. It will be beneficial for the babysitters to understand toddler developmental milestones to plan for the necessary activities. As paid employees, babysitters often require a disclosure or assessment of one's criminal record to ward off possible hebephiles, pedophiles, and other unsuitable applicants.

Cost

United States
According to the caregiver-finding platform UrbanSitter, the national average babysitting cost was $22.68 an hour for one child, $25.37 an hour for two, and $27.70 an hour for three children. This rate has increased by 21 percent since 2019.

Etymology
The term "baby sitter" first appeared in 1937, while the verb form "baby-sit" was first recorded in 1947. The American Heritage College Dictionary notes, "One normally would expect the agent noun babysitter with its -er suffix to come from the verb baby-sit, as diver comes from dive, but in fact babysitter is first recorded in 1937, ten years earlier than the first appearance of baby-sit. Thus the verb was derived from the agent noun rather than the other way around and represented a good example of back-formation. The use of the word "sit" to refer to a person tending to a child is recorded from 1800. The term may have originated from the caretaker "sitting on" the baby in one room while the parents were entertaining or busy in another. It's also theorized that the term may come from hens "sitting" on their eggs, thus "caring for" their chicks.

International variations in definition
In British English, the term refers only to caring for a child for a few hours, on an informal basis, and usually in the evening when the child is asleep for most of the time.

In American English, the term can include caring for a child for all or most of the day and on a regular or more formal basis, which would be described as childminding in British English.

In India and Pakistan, a babysitter or nanny, known as an ayah or aya, is hired on a longer-term contract basis to look after a child regardless of the presence of the parents.

References

Notes

Bibliography
 Miriam Forman-Brunell. Babysitter: An American History. New York University Press, June, 2009.from English dictionary

External links

 Babysitting courses provided by the American Red Cross
 YourChild: Babysitter Safety University of Michigan Health System
 A guide to the business of babysitting in the United States
 Quality Child Care From University of Florida/IFAS Department of Family, Youth and Community Sciences, Factors in choosing quality child care.

Babysitting
Babysitter
Caregiving